The Basingstoke Gazette is a local newspaper for Basingstoke, Hampshire, England. The newspaper is published once a week, on a Thursday. A Wednesday edition branded as the Basingstoke Extra, distributed free of charge, ceased to be published in 2017.

The newspaper is owned by regional newspaper publisher Newsquest.

External links
 

Gazette
Newspapers published in Hampshire
Newspapers published by Newsquest